Summer with Hope is a 2022 Canadian-Iranian drama film, directed, written and co-produced by Sadaf Foroughi. The film premiered on July 7, 2022 at the Karlovy Vary International Film Festival.

Premise 
Omid, a teenage athlete who is barred for bureaucratic reasons from a swimming competition; however, as his estranged father has made his consent to a divorce from his mother (Leili Rashidi) conditional on Omid's performance in the competition, he begins to train in open-water swimming under the coaching of Mani (Benyamin Peyrovani), with their increasingly close friendship leading to community rumours and allegations they are engaging in a gay sexual relationship with each other.

Release 
The film premiered on July 7, 2022 at the Karlovy Vary International Film Festival, where it won the Crystal Globe for Best Feature Film.

Awards
The film received three Canadian Screen Award nominations at the 11th Canadian Screen Awards in 2023, for Best Motion Picture, Best Supporting Performance in a Film (Rashidi) and Best Original Screenplay (Foroughi).

References

External links

2022 films
2022 drama films
2022 LGBT-related films
Iranian drama films
Iranian LGBT-related films
Canadian sports drama films
Canadian LGBT-related films
LGBT-related sports drama films
2020s Persian-language films
Films about Asian Canadians
Crystal Globe winners
Swimming films
2020s Canadian films